Dasht-e Soltanabad may refer to:
 Dasht-e Soltanabad 1
 Dasht-e Soltanabad 2
 Dasht-e Soltanabad 3
 Dasht-e Soltanabad 4